Albert Charles "Chase" Fawcett (April 5, 1863 – January 1, 1934) was a Canadian politician. He served in the Legislative Assembly of New Brunswick as member of the United Farmers party representing Westmorland County from 1921 to 1925.

References

20th-century Canadian politicians
1863 births
1948 deaths